Tim Kincaid (born July 2, 1944) is an American  film director, film writer and film producer often credited as Joe Gage or Mac Larson.

Kincaid is well known for having directed several science fiction/horror films in the mid-eighties: Breeders, Mutant Hunt, and most infamously Robot Holocaust, which was featured in an episode of Mystery Science Theater 3000 and released on Blu-ray by Scorpion Releasing.

Perception
To a perceptive viewer some of the characters in Gage's films can be clearly understood as "gay identified", while others are just as clearly intended to represent bisexual men who normally inhabit the heterosexual world and may even be happily married. Many other characters—perhaps most of them—defy easy categorization, however.  "I never went out of my way to emphasize the butch or straight attributes of my guys--I always sought to portray them as representatives of the average, ordinary, for the most part, working-class citizen."

For all of these reasons, Kincaid's aesthetic sensibilities had a significant impact not only on his contemporaries in the adult film world but on gay-male culture as it was developing in the 1970s and 1980s. "He's... the first artist who dared to suggest that sex between men was more about camaraderie than romance, more about hot action than a lifestyle.  While his characters were always working-class Joes, his 1970s epics became blueprints of sexual tension-building and were also stylistically innovative." Numerous filmmakers of today cite the Gage films as being highly instrumental in their own development, and one gay singer-songwriter (Mark Weigle, on Soul/Sex) used the phrase "a Joe Gage face" in his lyrics, knowing that for some listeners it would immediately evoke a certain kind of male handsomeness, in much the same way that "Gibson girl" brings to mind a specific type of feminine beauty. "The "Gage Men", as they were known during the heyday of the '70s, appeared more sexy Average Joe than Abercrombie & Fitch.  They tended toward "the hairy and the hunky".

Awards
2001 GayVN Awards Hall of Fame
 2011 XBIZ Award - Gay Director of the Year

See also
 List of male performers in gay porn films

References

External links

1944 births
Living people
American film directors
American pornographic film directors
American pornographic film producers
Directors of gay pornographic films
Producers of gay pornographic films